Sarena Lin (born 9 January 1971) is a member of the Management Board and Labor Director of Bayer, a DAX company based in Leverkusen.

Early life and education
Lin attended Harvard University in Boston where she studied computer science and graduated from Yale University in New Haven with a degree in international relations and an MBA in strategy.

Career
Lin's professional career began in 1998 at McKinsey as Managing Partner in Taipei and manager in New York City. In 2011, served as corporate vice president of strategy and business development and president of feed and nutrition at Cargill in Minneapolis, leaving the company in 2017. In 2018, Lin moved to Elanco Animal Health Incorporated, where she served, among other things, as a member of the Executive Committee dealing with Transformation and Technology.

Lin has been a member of the Bayer Board of Management since February 2021. After Erica Mann, who left the company in 2018, she is only the second woman on the Management Board in the company's history. She also took over the position of labor director that CEO Werner Baumann previously held, making her the HR manager for 100,000 employees. In her new position, she has to implement the reduction of around 12,000 jobs that the group announced in 2020.

Personal life 
Lin has Taiwanese and American citizenship, is married to a German man and has one daughter.

References

1971 births
Living people
20th-century American businesswomen
20th-century American businesspeople
21st-century American businesswomen
21st-century American businesspeople
Businesspeople from Taipei
Taiwanese emigrants to the United States
Bayer people
Harvard College alumni
Yale School of Management alumni